Fran Kurniawan Teng (born 1 April 1985) is an Indonesian badminton player from PB Djarum who specializes in doubles. In 2011, he became the determinant for the Indonesian team to qualified from the group stage at the 2011 Sudirman Cup. In the end, Indonesia won the bronze medal at that competition.

Personal life 
Kurniawan has a younger brother who also become badminton player named Fernando Kurniawan, but for now Fernando representing Hong Kong in international tournament. Kurniawan is married to Arlin Trisuci in Pantai Indah Kapuk on 16 February 2013. He is now managing his mother's culinary business.

Achievements

Asian Championships 
Mixed doubles

BWF Superseries (1 runner-up) 
The BWF Superseries, which was launched on 14 December 2006 and implemented in 2007, is a series of elite badminton tournaments, sanctioned by the Badminton World Federation (BWF). BWF Superseries levels are Superseries and Superseries Premier. A season of Superseries consists of twelve tournaments around the world that have been introduced since 2011. Successful players are invited to the Superseries Finals, which are held at the end of each year.

Mixed doubles

  BWF Superseries Finals tournament
  BWF Superseries Premier tournament
  BWF Superseries tournament

BWF Grand Prix (4 titles, 6 runners-up) 
The BWF Grand Prix had two levels, the BWF Grand Prix and Grand Prix Gold. It was a series of badminton tournaments sanctioned by the Badminton World Federation (BWF) which was held from 2007 to 2017.

Men's doubles

Mixed doubles

  BWF Grand Prix Gold tournament
  BWF Grand Prix tournament

BWF International Challenge/Series (11 titles, 7 runners-up) 
Men's doubles

Mixed doubles

  BWF International Challenge tournament
  BWF International Series tournament

Performance timeline

National team 
 Senior level

Individual competitions 
 Senior level

References

External links 
 

1985 births
Living people
People from Palembang
Sportspeople from South Sumatra
Indonesian people of Chinese descent
Indonesian male badminton players
Badminton players at the 2010 Asian Games
Asian Games medalists in badminton
Asian Games bronze medalists for Indonesia
Medalists at the 2010 Asian Games
20th-century Indonesian people
21st-century Indonesian people